Teymur Qasımov (born 14 October 1973) is an Azerbaijani sprinter. He competed in the 100 metres at the 2000 Summer Olympics and the 2004 Summer Olympics.

References

1973 births
Living people
Athletes (track and field) at the 2000 Summer Olympics
Athletes (track and field) at the 2004 Summer Olympics
Azerbaijani male sprinters
Olympic athletes of Azerbaijan
Place of birth missing (living people)
20th-century Azerbaijani people
21st-century Azerbaijani people